The 2018–19 season is Maccabi Tel Aviv's 112th season since its establishment in 1906, and 71st since the establishment of the State of Israel. During the 2018–19 campaignthe club have competed in the Israeli Premier League, State Cup, Toto Cup,  UEFA Europa League.

First team

Transfers

Summer

In:

Out:

Pre-season and friendlies

UEFA Europa League

First qualifying round

Second qualifying round

Third qualifying round

Playoff round

Israeli Premier League

Regular season

Regular season table

Play-off

Championship round table

State Cup

Toto Cup

Squad Statistics

Appearances and goals

|-
|colspan="14"|Players away from Maccabi Tel Aviv on loan:
|-

|-
|colspan="14"|Players who appeared for Maccabi Tel Aviv  that left during the season:

|-

|}

References

Maccabi Tel Aviv F.C. seasons
Maccabi Tel Aviv